Medeon was a town of ancient Boeotia, mentioned by Homer in the Catalogue of Ships in the Iliad. Medeon is described by Strabo as a dependency of Haliartus, and situated near Onchestus, at the foot of Mount Phoenicium, from which position it was afterwards called Phoenicis.

The site of Medeon is located near modern Davlosi (Davlosis).

Links

References

Cities in ancient Boeotia
Former populated places in Greece
Locations in the Iliad